Monmouth is a county constituency of the House of Commons of the Parliament of the United Kingdom (at Westminster). The seat was created for the 1918 general election. Since 2005 the Member of Parliament (MP) has been David Davies of the Conservative Party.

The Monmouth Senedd constituency, created in 1999, has normally the same boundaries as the Westminster constituency. These cover a large area, omitting the mainly urban areas of Blaenau Gwent in the west and Newport, Wales in the south.

History
The constituency is considered a safe seat of the Conservative Party although the seat has been won by the Labour Party in three general elections – in addition to the 1991 by-election.

The current MP is the Conservative David Davies, elected in 2005 and a former member for the Senedd seat of the same name. To avoid confusion with the Yorkshire Conservative David Davis, he is named in Hansard as "David T. C. Davies".

Boundaries

1983 onwards
The constituency is one of eight covering the preserved county of Gwent. The other seven are Blaenau Gwent, Caerphilly, Islwyn, Merthyr Tydfil and Rhymney, Newport East, Newport West and Torfaen. Merthyr Tydfil and Rhymney, however, straddles the boundary with the preserved county of Mid Glamorgan. It covers most of current local authority of Monmouthshire, with the main towns being Chepstow, Monmouth and Abergavenny.

For the 2010 general election, there were no changes to the boundaries of the Monmouth constituency stemming from the Fifth Review of the Boundary Commission for Wales. Likewise there were no boundary changes in 1997.

1918 to 1983
As first used in the 1918 general election, the constituency was a creation of the Representation of the People Act 1918 as one of six constituencies covering the county of Monmouth. Prior to the 1918 election the county had been covered, nominally, by the county constituencies of Northern Monmouthshire, Southern Monmouthshire, and Western Monmouthshire, and the Monmouth Boroughs borough constituency. By 1918, however, administrative county boundaries were out of alignment with constituency boundaries. The new constituency boundaries took account of the new local government boundaries.

The other Monmouthshire constituencies defined by the 1918 legislation were the county constituencies of Abertillery, Bedwellty, Ebbw Vale and Pontypool, and the borough constituency of Newport. This general pattern was maintained until 1983, nine years after the administrative county they were based on had been abolished, but there were some boundary changes during the 1918 to 1983 period.

In 1918 the Monmouth constituency was defined as consisting of the municipal boroughs of Abergavenny, and Monmouth, the urban districts of Caerleon, Chepstow, and Usk, the rural districts of Abergavenny, Chepstow, Magor, Monmouth, Cwmbran and Pontypool, and part of the rural district of St Mellons. The same boundaries were used for the general elections of 1922, 1923, 1924, 1929, 1931, 1935 and 1945.

New boundaries, created by the House of Commons (Redistribution of Seats) Act 1949, were used for the 1950 general election, and the Monmouth constituency was defined as consisting of the municipal boroughs of Abergavenny and Monmouth, the urban districts of Caerleon, Chepstow, Cwmbran and Usk, and the rural districts of Abergavenny, Chepstow, Magor and St Mellons, Monmouth, and Pontypool.

For the 1951 general election, there was some alteration to the boundaries of rural district of Magor and St Mellons.

The constituency was redefined again for the 1955 general election, taking account of new local government boundaries. The result was the same list of boroughs and districts as for the 1951 election. 1951 boundaries were used also in the general elections of 1959, 1964, 1966, 1970, February 1974, October 1974 and 1979.

In 1974, under the Local Government Act 1972, the local government county of Monmouth was abolished. For the 1983 general election, new constituency boundaries were drawn, taking account of new local government boundaries.

Members of Parliament
The following list does not include MPs who actually represented Monmouth Boroughs:

Elections

Elections in the 1910s

Elections in the 1920s

Elections in the 1930s

Elections in the 1940s

Elections in the 1950s

Elections in the 1960s

Elections in the 1970s

Elections in the 1980s

Elections in the 1990s

Elections in the 2000s

Elections in the 2010s

Of the 75 rejected ballots:
54 were either unmarked or it was uncertain who the vote was for.
20 voted for more than one candidate.
1 had writing or mark by which the voter could be identified.

Of the 104 rejected ballots:
70 were either unmarked or it was uncertain who the vote was for.
30 voted for more than one candidate.
4 had writing or mark by which the voter could be identified.

  

Of the 64 rejected ballots:
57 were either unmarked or it was uncertain who the vote was for.
7 voted for more than one candidate.

 

Of the 136 rejected ballots:
112 were either unmarked or it was uncertain who the vote was for.
24 voted for more than one candidate.

See also
 Monmouth (Senedd constituency)
 List of parliamentary constituencies in Gwent
 List of parliamentary constituencies in Wales

Notes

References

Further reading

External links
Politics Resources (Election results from 1922 onwards)
Electoral Calculus (Election results from 1955 onwards)
2017 Election House of Commons Library 2017 Election report
A Vision Of Britain Through Time (Constituency elector numbers)

Parliamentary constituencies in South Wales
Constituencies of the Parliament of the United Kingdom established in 1918
Monmouth, Wales